George Washington Bright (December 27, 1874 – March 20, 1949) was an American sailor serving in the United States Navy during the Spanish–American War who received the Medal of Honor for his actions.

Biography

He died March 20, 1949, and is buried in Blandford Cemetery Petersburg, Virginia. His grave can be found in ward C, section 13, lot 6.

Medal of Honor citation
Rank and organization: Coal Passer, U.S. Navy. Born: 27 December 1874, Norfolk, Va. Accredited to: Virginia. G.O. No.: 521, 7 July 1899.

Citation:

On board the U.S.S. Nashville during the cutting of the cable leading from Cienfuegos, Cuba, 11 May 1898. Facing the heavy fire of the enemy, Bright set an example of extraordinary bravery and coolness throughout this action.

See also

List of Medal of Honor recipients for the Spanish–American War

References

External links

1874 births
1949 deaths
United States Navy Medal of Honor recipients
United States Navy sailors
Military personnel from Norfolk, Virginia
American military personnel of the Spanish–American War
Spanish–American War recipients of the Medal of Honor